Chogha Zanbil (Elamite: Dur Untash) is an ancient Elamite complex in the Khuzestan province of Iran. It is one of the few existing ziggurats outside Mesopotamia.

History and etymology 
The Elamite language is a language isolate Chogha Zanbil is typically translated as 'basket mound.' It was built about 1250 BC by the king Untash-Napirisha, mainly to honor the great god Inshushinak. Its original name was Dur Untash, which means 'town of Untash' in Assyrian, but it is unlikely that many people, besides priests and servants, ever lived there. The complex is protected by three concentric walls which define the main areas of the 'town'. The inner area is wholly taken up with a great ziggurat dedicated to the main god, which was built over an earlier square temple with storage rooms also built by Untash-Napirisha.

The middle area holds eleven temples for lesser gods. It is believed that twenty-two temples were originally planned, but the king died before they could be finished, and his successors discontinued the building work. In the outer area are royal palaces, a funerary palace containing five subterranean royal tombs.

Although construction in the city abruptly ended after Untash-Napirisha's death, the site was not abandoned, but continued to be occupied until it was destroyed by the Assyrian king Ashurbanipal in 640 BC. Some scholars speculate, based on the large number of temples and sanctuaries at Chogha Zanbil, that Untash-Napirisha attempted to create a new religious center (possibly intended to replace Susa) which would unite the gods of both highland and lowland Elam at one site.

Mud brick was the basic material of the whole ensemble. The ziggurat was given a facing of baked bricks, a number of which have cuneiform characters giving the names of deities in the Elamite and Akkadian languages.

The ziggurat is considered to be the best preserved example of the stepped pyramidal monument by UNESCO. In 1979, Chogha Zanbil became the first Iranian site to be inscribed on the UNESCO World Heritage List.

Archaeology 

Chogha Zanbil was excavated in six seasons between 1951 and 1961 by Roman Ghirshman.

Threats 
Petroleum exploration due to increased global demand threatens the foundations of the site, as various seismic tests have been undertaken to explore for reserves of petroleum.

Gallery

See also 

 Step pyramid
 Iranian architecture
 List of Iranian castles, citadels, and fortifications
 Cities of the ancient Near East

References

Bibliography 
 D. T. Potts, The Archaeology of Elam: Formation and Transformation of an Ancient Iranian State, Cambridge University Press, 1999, 
 Roman Ghirshman, La ziggourat de Tchoga-Zanbil (Susiane), Comptes-rendus des séances de l'Académie des Inscriptions et Belles-Lettres, vol. 98 lien Issue 2, pp. 233–238, 1954
 Roman Ghirshman, Campagne de fouilles à Tchoga-Zanbil, près de Suse, Comptes-rendus des séances de l'Académie des Inscriptions et Belles-Lettres, vol.  99, iss. 1, pp. 112–113, 1955
 Roman Ghirshman, Cinquième campagne de fouilles à Tchoga-Zanbil, près Suse, rapport préliminaire (1955–1956), Comptes-rendus des séances de l'Académie des Inscriptions et Belles-Lettres, vol. 100, iss. 3, pp. 335–345, 1956
 Roman Ghirshman, Les fouilles de Tchoga-Zanbil, près de Suse (1956), Comptes-rendus des séances de l'Académie des Inscriptions et Belles-Lettres, vol.  100, iss. 2, pp. 137–138, 1956
 Roman Ghirshman, VIe campagne de fouilles à Tchoga-Zanbil près de Suse (1956–1957), rapport préliminaire, Comptes-rendus des séances de l'Académie des Inscriptions et Belles-Lettres, vol. 101, iss. 3, pp. 231–241, 1957
 Roman Ghirshman, FouiIles de Tchoga-Zanbil près de Suse, complexe de quatre temples, Comptes-rendus des séances de l'Académie des Inscriptions et Belles-Lettres, vol. 103, iss. 1, pp. 74–76, 1959
 Roman Ghirshman, VIIe campagne de fouilles à Tchoga-Zanbil, près de Suse (1958–1959), rapport préliminaire,  Comptes-rendus des séances de l'Académie des Inscriptions et Belles-Lettres, vol. 103, iss. 2, pp. 287–297, 1959
 GHIRSHMAN, Roman. "TCHOGA-ZANBIL RAPPORT PRÉLIMINAIRE DE LA VIII  e CAMPAGNE (1960-1961)." Arts Asiatiques, vol. 8, no. 2, 1961, pp. 121–38
 P. Amiet, Marlik et Tchoga Zanbil, Revue d'Assyriologie et d'Archéologie Orientale, vol. 84, no. 1, pp. 44–47, 1990

External links 

 6,000-Year-Old Ziggurat Found Near Chogha Zanbil In Iran - 2004
 Chogha Zanbil
 World Heritage profile
 guide to Choga Zanbil

Archaeological sites in Iran
World Heritage Sites in Iran
Castles in Iran
Ancient Near East temples
Former populated places in Khuzestan Province
Shush County
Buildings and structures in Khuzestan Province
Tourist attractions in Khuzestan Province
Pyramids in Iran
National works of Iran
Elamite cities
Ziggurats